Post offices are scattered throughout Hong Kong. All of them are managed by Hongkong Post. As of 2020, there are 30 post offices on Hong Kong Island, 35 in Kowloon, 48 in the New Territories and eight on the Outlying Islands. There are also three mobile post offices providing postal services in remote areas in the New Territories.

Post offices in service

Post offices on Hong Kong Island

Post offices at Kowloon

Post offices in the New Territories

Post offices on the Outlying Islands

Notes# – Philatelic office

Mobile post offices
 Mobile Post Office No.1 serves New Territories areas without post offices nearby. Areas served include Tsuen Wan, Tuen Mun, Yuen Long, Sheung Shui, Fanling, Tai Po and Shatin.
 Mobile Post Office No.2 also serves the remote areas, namely Clear Water Bay, Sai Kung, Shatin and Tai Po.

Service in the Chinese University of Hong Kong and the Hong Kong University of Science and Technology has been suspended.

Defunct post offices

Other postal buildings

References 

 List